William Fulton born in Alva, Scotland was a Scottish footballer who played as an inside left. He made 39 Football League appearances scoring 4 goals and 25 Southern League appearances scoring 8 goals in the years before the First World War. Fulton also played for Alloa Athletic in Scotland.

Career
William Fulton played locally for Alva Albion Rovers and had a trial with Preston North End. After turning professional in 1898 Fulton played two seasons for Sunderland in Division One before moving south to play in the Southern League for Bristol City in 1900–01. This was his most prolific scoring period in England with 8 goals. Fulton returned to Division One football with Derby County for a single season before returning to Scotland in 1902 playing with Alloa Athletic in Scottish non league football as Alloa did not enter the Scottish League until 1921.

Honours
with Bristol City
Southern Football League runners up: 1900–01

References

Scottish footballers
Association football inside forwards
English Football League players
Southern Football League players
Sunderland A.F.C. players
Derby County F.C. players
Bristol City F.C. players
Sportspeople from Clackmannanshire
Year of death missing
Year of birth missing